Richard William Butler (21 May 1844 – 21 December 1928) was a British dramatist and editor of The Referee magazine in the late Victorian period.

He shared a joint pen name, Richard Henry, with Henry Chance Newton.  Works attributed to Richard Henry include Monte Cristo Jr. (burlesque melodrama 1886); Jubilation (musical mixture 1887); Frankenstein, or The Vampire's Victim, a parody of the Mary Shelley novel Frankenstein, presented at the Gaiety Theatre, London, in 1887; and Opposition (a debate in one sitting 1892).

Notes

1844 births
1928 deaths
British newspaper editors